"4 + 20" is a song by Crosby, Stills, Nash & Young, written by Stephen Stills, originally released on the band's 1970 album Déjà Vu. It was performed by Stephen Stills on solo acoustic guitar.

The song describes the inner torments and reflections of a man on his past, present and future. In the CSN boxed set, Stills explained: "It's about an 84-year-old poverty stricken man who started and finished with nothing."

Stills recorded the song in one take and planned to use it on his upcoming debut solo album, but when his bandmates heard it, they implored him to use it on the Déjà Vu album. He planned to have bandmates David Crosby and Graham Nash sing harmony parts, but they refused. "They told me they wouldn't touch it," said Stills. "So it always stood alone." On the highly-collaborative Déjà Vu album, "4 + 20" stands out as the only song which was both written and performed solo by one member of the band, justified by Crosby who recalled "We just said, 'It's too damn good, we're not touching it.'"

Personnel 

 Stephen Stills – lead vocals, guitar

References 

1970 songs
Songs written by Stephen Stills
Crosby, Stills, Nash & Young songs
Songs about old age
Songs about poverty